The Guadalcanal campaign, also known as the Battle of Guadalcanal and codenamed Operation Watchtower by American forces, was a military campaign fought between 7 August 1942 and 9 February 1943 on and around the island of Guadalcanal in the Pacific theater of World War II. It was the first major land offensive by Allied forces against the Empire of Japan.

On 7 August 1942, Allied forces, predominantly United States Marines, landed on Guadalcanal, Tulagi, and Florida Island in the southern Solomon Islands, with the objective of using Guadalcanal and Tulagi as bases in supporting a campaign to eventually capture or neutralize the major Japanese base at Rabaul on New Britain. The Japanese defenders, who had occupied those islands since May 1942, were outnumbered and overwhelmed by the Allies, who captured Tulagi and Florida, as well as the airfield—later named Henderson Field—that was under construction on Guadalcanal.

Surprised by the Allied offensive, the Japanese made several attempts between August and November to retake Henderson Field. Three major land battles, seven large naval battles (five nighttime surface actions and two carrier battles), and almost daily aerial battles culminated in the decisive Naval Battle of Guadalcanal in early November, with the defeat of the last Japanese attempt to bombard Henderson Field from the sea and to land enough troops to retake it. In December, the Japanese abandoned their efforts to retake Guadalcanal and evacuated their remaining forces by 7 February 1943, in the face of an offensive by the U.S. Army's XIV Corps, with the Battle of Rennell Island, the last major naval engagement, serving to secure protection for the Japanese troops to evacuate safely.

The campaign followed the successful Allied defensive actions at the Battle of the Coral Sea and the Battle of Midway in May and June 1942. Along with the battles at Milne Bay and Buna–Gona, the Guadalcanal campaign marked the Allies' transition from defensive operations to offensive ones and effectively allowed them to seize the strategic initiative in the Pacific theater from the Japanese. The campaign was followed by other Allied offensives in the Pacific, most notably: the Solomon Islands campaign, New Guinea campaign, the Gilbert and Marshall Islands campaign, the Mariana and Palau Islands campaign, the Philippines campaign (1944–1945), and the Volcano and Ryukyu Islands campaign prior to the surrender of Japan in August, 1945.

Background

Strategic considerations

On 7 December 1941, Japanese forces attacked the United States Pacific Fleet at Pearl Harbor, Hawaii. The attack killed almost 2,500 people and crippled much of the U.S. battleship fleet, precipitating formal declarations of war between the two nations the next day. The initial goals of Japanese leaders were to neutralize the U.S. Navy, seize territories rich in natural resources, and establish strategic military bases to defend Japan's empire in the Pacific Ocean and Asia. Initially, Japanese forces captured the Philippines, Thailand, Malaya, Singapore, Burma, the Dutch East Indies, Wake Island, Gilbert Islands, New Britain and Guam. Joining the U.S. in the war against Japan were the rest of the Allied powers, several of whom, including the British Empire and the Dutch Empire, had also been attacked by Japan.

The Japanese made two attempts to continue their offensive and extend their outer defensive perimeter in the south and central Pacific to where they could threaten Australia, Hawaii, and the U.S. west coast. The first offensive was thwarted in the naval Battle of the Coral Sea, which was a tactical stalemate but in retrospect a strategic Allied victory. It was the Allies' first major victory against the Japanese and significantly reduced the offensive capability of Japan's carrier forces. However, it did not change Japan's over-audacious offensive mindset for several crucial months, as in the failed attack on Port Moresby over the Kokoda track. The second major Japanese offensive was stopped at the Battle of Midway. These strategic victories in the Pacific allowed the Allies to switch from the defensive to seize the initiative from Japan.

The Allies chose the Solomon Islands (a protectorate of the United Kingdom), specifically the southern islands of Guadalcanal, Tulagi and Florida Island, as the first target, designated Task One (codename Pestilence), with the initial objectives to occupy the Santa Cruz Islands (codename Huddle), Tulagi (codename Watchtower), and "adjacent positions". Guadalcanal (codename Cactus), which eventually became the focus of the operation, was not even mentioned in the early directive and only later took on the operation name Watchtower. Tiny Tulagi had a large natural harbor perfect for a float-plane base and small Florida had to be taken as it dominated Tulagi. Large Guadalcanal, south across the soon-to-be-named Iron Bottom Sound was added when it was discovered the Japanese were building an airbase there.

The Imperial Japanese Navy (IJN) had occupied Tulagi in May and had constructed a seaplane base nearby. Allied concern grew when, in early July, the IJN began constructing a large airfield at Lunga Point on nearby Guadalcanal—from such a base Japanese long-range bombers could threaten the sea lines of communication from the west coast of the Americas to the populous east coast of Australia. By August, the Japanese had about 900 naval troops on Tulagi and nearby islands and 2,800 personnel (2,200 being Korean forced laborers and trustees as well as Japanese construction specialists) on Guadalcanal. These bases would protect Japan's major base at Rabaul, threaten Allied supply and communication lines, and establish a staging area for a planned offensive against Fiji, New Caledonia and Samoa (Operation FS). The Japanese planned to deploy 45 fighters and 60 bombers to Guadalcanal. In the overall strategy for 1942, these aircraft would provide air cover for Japanese naval forces advancing farther into the South Pacific.

The Allied plan to invade the southern Solomons was conceived by U.S. Admiral Ernest King, Commander in Chief, United States Fleet. He proposed the offensive to deny the use of the islands by the Japanese as bases to threaten the supply routes between the United States and Australia and to use them as starting points. With U.S. President Franklin D. Roosevelt's tacit consent, King also advocated the invasion of Guadalcanal. Because the United States supported Great Britain's proposal that priority be given to defeating Germany before Japan, the Pacific theater had to compete for personnel and resources with the European theater.

An early obstacle was a desire by both the army and Roosevelt to initiate action in Europe. In addition, it was unclear who would command the campaign: Tulagi lay in the area under the command of General Douglas MacArthur, whereas the Santa Cruz Islands lay in Admiral Chester W. Nimitz's Pacific Ocean Area, which would also supply almost all offensive forces that would prepare and be supplied and covered from that area. Both problems were overcome, and the Chief of Staff of the U.S. Army, General George C. Marshall, gave the operation his full support, even if MacArthur's command could not lend support and the navy had to take full responsibility.

Chief of Staff to the Commander in Chief William D. Leahy established two goals for 1942–1943: that Guadalcanal would be taken, in conjunction with an Allied offensive in New Guinea under MacArthur; and the capture of the Admiralty Islands and Bismarck Archipelago, including the major Japanese base at Rabaul. The directive held that the eventual goal was the American reconquest of the Philippines. The U.S. Joint Chiefs of Staff created the South Pacific theater, with Vice Admiral Robert L. Ghormley taking command on 19 June, to direct the offensive in the Solomons. Nimitz, based at Pearl Harbor, was designated as overall Allied commander-in-chief for Pacific forces.

Task force

In preparation for the offensive in the Pacific in May 1942, U.S. Marine Major General Alexander Vandegrift was ordered to move his 1st Marine Division from the United States to New Zealand. Other Allied land, naval and air force units were sent to establish or reinforce bases in Fiji, Samoa, New Hebrides and New Caledonia.

Espiritu Santo, New Hebrides, was selected as the headquarters, Espiritu Santo Naval Base, and the main base for the offensive, codenamed Operation Watchtower, with the commencement date set for 7 August. At first, the Allied offensive was planned just for Tulagi and the Santa Cruz Islands, omitting Guadalcanal. After Allied reconnaissance discovered the Japanese airfield construction efforts on Guadalcanal, its capture was added to the plan, and the Santa Cruz operation was (eventually) dropped. The Japanese were aware, via signals intelligence, of the large-scale movement of Allied forces in the South Pacific Area but concluded that the Allies were reinforcing Australia and perhaps Port Moresby in New Guinea.

The Watchtower force, numbering 75 warships and transports (of vessels from the U.S. and Australia), assembled near Fiji on 26 July and engaged in one rehearsal landing prior to leaving for Guadalcanal on 31 July. The commander of the Allied expeditionary force was U.S. Vice Admiral Frank Fletcher, Commander Task Force 61 (whose flag was on the aircraft carrier ). Commanding the amphibious forces was U.S. Rear Admiral Richmond K. Turner. Vandegrift led the 16,000 Allied (primarily U.S. Marine) infantry earmarked for the landings. The troops sent to Guadalcanal were fresh from military training and armed with bolt-action M1903 Springfield rifles and a meager 10-day supply of ammunition. Because of the need to get them into battle quickly, the operation planners had reduced their supplies from 90 days to only 60. The men of the 1st Marine Division began referring to the coming battle as "Operation Shoestring".

Events

Landings

Bad weather allowed the Allied expeditionary force to arrive unseen by the Japanese on the night of 6 August and the following morning, taking the defenders by surprise. This is sometimes called the "Midnight Raid on Guadalcanal". A Japanese patrol aircraft from Tulagi had searched the general area the Allied invasion fleet was moving through but missed seeing the Allied ships because of severe storms and heavy clouds. The landing force split into two groups with one group assaulting Guadalcanal and the other Tulagi, Florida, and nearby islands. Allied warships bombarded the invasion beaches, while U.S. carrier aircraft bombed Japanese positions on the target islands and destroyed 15 Japanese seaplanes at their base near Tulagi.

Tulagi and two nearby small islands, Gavutu and Tanambogo, were assaulted by 3,000 U.S. Marines under the command of Brigadier General William Rupertus. The 886 IJN personnel manning the naval and seaplane bases on the three islands fiercely resisted the Marine attacks. With some difficulty, the Marines secured all three islands: Tulagi on 8 August, and Gavutu and Tanambogo by 9 August. The Japanese defenders were killed almost to the last man, and the Marines had 248 casualties.

In contrast to Tulagi, Gavutu, and Tanambogo, the landings on Guadalcanal encountered much less resistance. At 09:10 on 7 August, Vandegrift and 11,000 U.S. Marines came ashore on Guadalcanal between Koli Point and Lunga Point. Advancing towards Lunga Point, they encountered little resistance and secured the airfield by 16:00 on 8 August.

During the landing operations on 7 and 8 August, Japanese naval aircraft based at Rabaul, under the command of Yamada Sadayoshi, attacked the Allied amphibious forces several times, setting afire the transport  (which sank two days later) and heavily damaging the destroyer . In the air attacks over the two days the Japanese lost 36 aircraft, while the U.S. lost 19, both in combat and to accidents, including 14 carrier fighters.

After these clashes, Fletcher was concerned about the losses to his carrier fighter aircraft strength, anxious about the threat to his carriers from further Japanese air attacks, and worried about his ships' fuel levels. Fletcher withdrew from the Solomon Islands area with his carrier task forces on the evening of 8 August. As a result of the loss of carrier-based air cover, Turner decided to withdraw his ships from Guadalcanal, even though less than half of the supplies and heavy equipment needed by the troops ashore had been unloaded. Turner planned, however, to unload as many supplies as possible on Guadalcanal and Tulagi throughout the night of 8 August and then depart with his ships early on 9 August.

Battle of Savo Island

As the transports unloaded on the night of 8–9 August, two groups of screening Allied cruisers and destroyers, under the command of British Rear Admiral Victor Crutchley, were surprised and defeated by a Japanese force of seven cruisers and one destroyer from the 8th Fleet based at Rabaul and Kavieng and commanded by Japanese Vice Admiral Gunichi Mikawa. 

One Australian and three American cruisers were sunk and one American cruiser and two destroyers were damaged. The Japanese suffered moderate damage to one cruiser. Mikawa, who was unaware Fletcher was preparing to withdraw with the U.S. carriers, immediately retired to Rabaul without attempting to attack the transports. Mikawa was concerned about daylight U.S. carrier air attacks if he remained in the area. Bereft of his carrier air cover, Turner decided to withdraw his remaining naval forces by the evening of 9 August and in so doing left the Marines ashore with much of the heavy equipment, provisions and troops still aboard the transports. Mikawa's decision not to attempt to destroy the Allied transport ships when he had the opportunity proved to be a crucial strategic mistake.

Initial ground operations

The 11,000 Marines on Guadalcanal initially concentrated on forming a loose defensive perimeter around Lunga Point and the airfield, moving the landed supplies within the perimeter and finishing the airfield. In four days of intense effort, the supplies were moved from the landing beach into dispersed dumps within the perimeter. Work began on the airfield immediately, mainly using captured Japanese equipment. On 12 August the airfield was named Henderson Field after Lofton R. Henderson, a Marine aviator who was killed during the Battle of Midway. By 18 August the airfield was ready for operation. Five days' worth of food had been landed from the transports, which, along with captured Japanese provisions, gave the Marines a total of 14 days' supply of food. To conserve supplies, the troops were limited to two meals per day.

Allied troops encountered a severe strain of dysentery soon after the landings, with one in five Marines afflicted by mid-August. Although some of the Korean construction workers surrendered to the Marines, most of the remaining Japanese and Korean personnel gathered just west of the Lunga perimeter on the west bank of the Matanikau River and subsisted mainly on coconuts. A Japanese naval outpost was also located at Taivu Point, about 35 kilometers (22 mi) east of the Lunga perimeter. On 8 August, a Japanese destroyer from Rabaul delivered 113 naval reinforcement troops to the Matanikau position.

Goettge patrol
On the evening of 12 August, a 25-man U.S. Marine patrol, led by Division D-2 Lieutenant Colonel Frank Goettge and primarily consisting of intelligence personnel, landed by boat west of the U.S. Marine Lunga perimeter, east of Point Cruz and west of the Japanese perimeter at Matanikau River, on a reconnaissance mission with a secondary objective of contacting a group of Japanese troops that U.S. forces believed might be willing to surrender. Soon after the patrol landed, a nearby platoon of Japanese naval troops attacked it and almost completely wiped it out.

In response, on 19 August, Vandegrift sent three companies of the U.S. 5th Marine Regiment to attack the Japanese troop concentration west of the Matanikau. The third landed by boat further west and attacked Kokumbuna village. After briefly occupying the two villages, the three Marine companies returned to the Lunga perimeter, having killed about 65 Japanese soldiers while losing four Marines. This action, sometimes referred to as the "First Battle of the Matanikau", was the first of several major actions around the Matanikau River during the campaign.

On 20 August, the escort carrier  delivered a squadron of 19 Grumman F4F Wildcats and a squadron of 12 Douglas SBD Dauntlesses to Henderson Field. The aircraft at Henderson became known as the "Cactus Air Force" after the Allied codename for Guadalcanal. The Marine fighters went into action the next day on the first of the almost-daily Japanese bomber air raids. On 22 August five U.S. Army Bell P-400 Airacobras and their pilots arrived at Henderson Field.

Battle of the Tenaru

In response to the Allied landings on Guadalcanal, the Japanese Imperial General Headquarters assigned the Imperial Japanese Army's (IJA) 17th Army, a corps-sized command based at Rabaul and under the command of Lieutenant General Harukichi Hyakutake, the task of retaking Guadalcanal. The army was to be supported by Japanese naval units, including the Combined Fleet under the command of Isoroku Yamamoto, which was headquartered at Truk. The 17th Army, at that time heavily involved in the Japanese campaign in New Guinea, had only a few units available. Of these, the 35th Infantry Brigade under Major General Kiyotake Kawaguchi was at Palau, the 4th (Aoba) Infantry Regiment was in the Philippines and the 28th (Ichiki) Infantry Regiment, under the command of Colonel Kiyonao Ichiki, was on board transport ships near Guam. The different units began to move towards Guadalcanal via Truk and Rabaul immediately, but Ichiki's regiment, being the closest, arrived in the area first. A "First Element" of Ichiki's unit, consisting of about 917 soldiers, landed from destroyers at Taivu Point, east of the Lunga perimeter, after midnight on 19 August then made a  night march west toward the Marine perimeter.

Underestimating the strength of Allied forces on Guadalcanal, Ichiki's unit conducted a nighttime frontal assault on Marine positions at Alligator Creek (often called the "Ilu River" on U.S. Marine maps) on the east side of the Lunga perimeter in the early morning hours of 21 August. Jacob Vouza, a Solomon Islands Coastwatcher scout, warned the Americans of the impending attack minutes before Ichiki's assault, which was subsequently defeated with heavy losses to the Japanese. After daybreak, the Marine units counterattacked Ichiki's surviving troops, killing many more of them. The dead included Ichiki, though it has been claimed that he committed seppuku after realizing the magnitude of his defeat, rather than dying in combat. In total, 789 of the original 917 members of the Ichiki Regiment's First Element were killed in the battle. About 30 survived the battle and joined Ichiki's rear guard of about 100, and these 128 Japanese returned to Taivu Point, notified 17th Army headquarters of their defeat and awaited further reinforcements and orders from Rabaul.

Battle of the Eastern Solomons

As the Tenaru battle was ending, more Japanese reinforcements were already on their way. Yamamoto put together a very powerful expeditionary force. Their aim was to destroy any American fleet units in the area and then eliminate Henderson Field. This force sortied from Truk on 23 August. Several other reinforcements, support, and bombardment groups sortied from both Truk and Rabaul. Three slow transport ships departed from Truk on 16 August, carrying the remaining 1,400 soldiers from Ichiki's (28th) Infantry Regiment plus 500 naval marines from the 5th Yokosuka Special Naval Landing Force. The transports were guarded by 13 warships commanded by Japanese Rear Admiral Raizō Tanaka, who planned to land the troops on Guadalcanal on 24 August. To cover the landings of these troops and provide support for the operation to retake Henderson Field from Allied forces, Yamamoto directed Chūichi Nagumo to sortie with a carrier force from Truk on 21 August and head towards the southern Solomon Islands. Nagumo's force included three carriers and 30 other warships. Yamamoto would send the light carrier Ryūjō on a possible bait role ahead of the rest of the fleet and attack Guadalcanal to draw the attention of the American pilots. The aircraft from the two fleet carriers would then attack the Americans.

Simultaneously, the U.S. carrier task forces under Fletcher approached Guadalcanal to counter the Japanese offensive efforts. On 24 August, the two carrier forces fought. The American forces had two carriers, the Saratoga and Enterprise, and their 176 aircraft. The bait carrier Ryūjō was hit by several  bombs, then by an aerial torpedo; she was then abandoned and sank that night. The two Japanese fleet carriers were not attacked. Enterprise was attacked and damaged. Both fleets then retreated from the area. The Japanese lost Ryūjō, dozens of aircraft, and most of their aircrew; the Americans lost a handful of planes, and Enterprise was damaged, needing repair for two months.

On 25 August, Tanaka's convoy, headed by the flagship , was attacked near Taivu Point by Cactus Air Force aircraft from Henderson Field. After suffering heavy damage during the battle, including the sinking of one of the transports, the convoy was forced to divert to the Shortland Islands in the northern Solomons in order to transfer the surviving troops to destroyers for later delivery to Guadalcanal. A Japanese transport was sunk, and the older destroyer Mutsuki was so badly damaged that it had to be scuttled. Several other warships were damaged, including Tanaka's own Jintsū. At this point, Tanaka withdrew and rescheduled the supply run for the night of 28 August, via the remaining destroyers. Meanwhile, the Japanese had launched an air raid on Guadalcanal, causing chaos and havoc.

On 25 August, the American carrier Wasp, after refueling, positioned itself east of Guadalcanal expecting Japanese movement to the area. No Japanese forces made any movement towards the area, and the Wasp was left idle.

Strategically, the Japanese had an opportunity here for a decisive victory; however, they failed to realize this potential. They allowed the Americans to step away with a view of victory. Additionally, the reinforcement of Henderson Field of Guadalcanal by Enterprises aircraft established a precedent. This made daylight supply runs to Guadalcanal impossible for Japanese shipments. Only weeks before this, the Japanese had total control of the sea in this particular region; now they were forced to make supply runs only under the cover of darkness.

Air battles over Henderson Field and strengthening of the Lunga defenses

Throughout August, small numbers of U.S. aircraft and their crews continued to arrive at Guadalcanal. By the end of August, 64 aircraft of various types were stationed at Henderson Field. On 3 September, the commander of the 1st Marine Aircraft Wing, U.S. Marine Brigadier General Roy Geiger, arrived with his staff and took command of all air operations at Henderson Field. Air battles between the Allied aircraft at Henderson and Japanese bombers and fighters from Rabaul continued almost daily. Between 26 August and 5 September, the U.S. lost about 15 aircraft to the Japanese's approximately 19 . More than half of the U.S. aircrews shot down were rescued, while most of the Japanese aircrews were not recovered. Australian coastwatchers on Bougainville and New Georgia islands were often able to provide the Allied forces on Guadalcanal with advance notice of inbound Japanese air strikes, allowing the U.S. fighters time to take off and position themselves to attack the Japanese aircraft as they approached the island. The Japanese air forces were slowly losing a war of attrition in the skies above Guadalcanal.

During this time, Vandegrift continued to direct efforts to strengthen and improve the defenses of the Lunga perimeter. Between 21 August and 3 September, he relocated three Marine battalions, including the 1st Raider Battalion, under Merritt A. Edson (Edson's Raiders), and the 1st Parachute Battalion from Tulagi and Gavutu to Guadalcanal. These units added about 1,500 troops to Vandegrift's original 11,000 men defending Henderson Field. The 1st Parachute Battalion, which had suffered heavy casualties in the Battle of Tulagi and Gavutu–Tanambogo in August, was placed under Edson's command.

The other relocated battalion, the 1st Battalion, 5th Marine Regiment, was landed by boat west of the Matanikau near Kokumbuna village on 27 August with the mission of attacking Japanese units in the area, much as in the first Matanikau action of 19 August. The Marines were impeded by difficult terrain, hot sun, and well-emplaced Japanese defenses. The next morning, the Marines found that the Japanese defenders had departed during the night, so the Marines returned to the Lunga perimeter by boat. These actions resulted in the loss of 20 Japanese and 3 Marines.

Small Allied naval convoys arrived at Guadalcanal on 23 and 29 August, and 1 and 8 September to provide the Marines at Lunga with more food, ammunition, aircraft fuel, aircraft technicians, and other supplies. The convoy on 1 September also brought 392 Seabees to maintain and improve Henderson Field. In addition, on 3 September, Marine Aircraft Group 25 began airlifting high-priority cargo, including personnel, aviation gasoline, munitions, and other supplies, to Henderson Field.

Tokyo Express

By 23 August, Kawaguchi's 35th Infantry Brigade reached Truk and was loaded onto slow transport ships for the rest of the trip to Guadalcanal. The damage done to Tanaka's convoy during the Battle of the Eastern Solomons caused the Japanese to reconsider trying to deliver more troops to Guadalcanal by slow transport. Instead, the ships carrying Kawaguchi's soldiers were sent to Rabaul. From there, the Japanese planned to deliver Kawaguchi's men to Guadalcanal by destroyers staging through a Japanese naval base in the Shortland Islands. The Japanese destroyers were usually able to make round trips down "The Slot" (New Georgia Sound) to Guadalcanal and back in a single night throughout the campaign, minimizing their exposure to Allied air attack. The runs became known as the "Tokyo Express" to Allied forces and were labeled "rat transportation" by the Japanese. While troops could be transported in this manner, most of the heavy equipment and supplies, such as heavy artillery, vehicles, and much food and ammunition, could not. In addition, this activity tied up destroyers the IJN desperately needed to escort their convoys. Either inability or unwillingness prevented Allied naval commanders from frequently challenging Japanese naval forces at night, so the Japanese controlled the seas around the Solomon Islands during nighttime. However, any Japanese ship within range of the aircraft at Henderson Field in daylight was at great risk from air attack. This tactical situation existed for the next several months of the campaign.

Between 29 August and 4 September, Japanese light cruisers, destroyers, and patrol boats were able to land almost 5,000 troops at Taivu Point, including most of the 35th Infantry Brigade, much of the Aoba (4th) Regiment, and the rest of Ichiki's regiment. General Kawaguchi, who landed at Taivu Point on 31 August Express run, was placed in command of all Japanese forces on Guadalcanal. A barge convoy took another 1,000 soldiers of Kawaguchi's brigade, under the command of Colonel Akinosuke Oka, to Kamimbo, west of the Lunga perimeter.

Battle of Edson's Ridge 

On 7 September, Kawaguchi issued his attack plan to "rout and annihilate the enemy in the vicinity of the Guadalcanal Island airfield". Kawaguchi's attack plan called for his forces, split into three divisions, to approach the Lunga perimeter inland, culminating with a surprise night attack. Oka's forces would attack the perimeter from the west while Ichiki's Second Echelon, renamed the Kuma Battalion, would attack from the east. The main attack would be by Kawaguchi's "Center Body", numbering 3,000 men in three battalions, from the jungle south of the Lunga perimeter. By 7 September, most of Kawaguchi's troops had departed Taivu to begin marching towards Lunga Point along the coastline. About 250 Japanese troops remained behind to guard the brigade's supply base at Taivu.

Meanwhile, native scouts under the direction of Martin Clemens, a coastwatcher officer in the British Solomon Islands Protectorate Defence Force and the British district officer for Guadalcanal, brought reports to the U.S. Marines of Japanese troops at Taivu near the village of Tasimboko. Edson planned a raid on the Japanese troop concentration at Taivu. On 8 September, after being dropped off near Taivu by boat, Edson's men captured Tasimboko as the Japanese defenders retreated into the jungle. In Tasimboko, Edson's troops discovered Kawaguchi's main supply depot, including large stockpiles of food, ammunition, medical supplies, and a powerful shortwave radio. After destroying everything in sight, except for some documents and equipment carried back with them, the Marines returned to the Lunga perimeter. The mounds of supplies along with intelligence gathered from the captured documents informed the Marines that at least 3,000 Japanese troops were on the island and apparently planning an attack.

Edson, along with Colonel Gerald C. Thomas, Vandegrift's operations officer, correctly believed that the Japanese attack would come at Lunga Ridge, a narrow, grassy,  coral ridge that ran parallel to the Lunga River located just south of Henderson Field. The ridge offered a natural avenue of approach to the airfield, commanded the surrounding area, and was almost undefended. On 11 September, the 840 men of Edson's battalion were deployed onto and around the ridge.

On the night of 12 September, Kawaguchi's 1st Battalion attacked the Raiders between the Lunga River and ridge, forcing one Marine company to fall back to the ridge before the Japanese halted their attack for the night. The next night Kawaguchi faced Edson's 840 Raiders with 3,000 troops of his brigade plus an assortment of light artillery. The Japanese attack began just after nightfall, with Kawaguchi's 1st battalion assaulting Edson's right flank just to the west of the ridge. After breaking through the Marine lines the battalion's assault was eventually stopped by Marine units guarding the northern part of the ridge.

Two companies from Kawaguchi's 2nd Battalion charged up the southern edge of the ridge and pushed Edson's troops back to Hill 123 on the center part of the ridge. Throughout the night Marines at this position, who were supported by artillery, defeated wave after wave of frontal Japanese attacks, some of which resulted in hand-to-hand fighting. Japanese units that infiltrated past the ridge to the edge of the airfield were also repulsed. Attacks by the Kuma Battalion and Oka's unit at other locations on the Lunga perimeter were also defeated. On 14 September Kawaguchi led the survivors of his shattered brigade on a five-day march west to the Matanikau Valley to join with Oka's unit. In total Kawaguchi's forces lost about 850 killed and the Marines 104.

On 15 September at Rabaul, Hyakutake learned of Kawaguchi's defeat and forwarded the news to Imperial General Headquarters in Japan. In an emergency session the top Japanese IJA and IJN command staffs concluded that "Guadalcanal might develop into the decisive battle of the war". The results of the battle now began to have a telling strategic impact on Japanese operations in other areas of the Pacific. Hyakutake realized that he could not send sufficient troops and materiel to defeat the Allied forces on Guadalcanal and at the same time support the major ongoing Japanese offensive on the Kokoda Track in New Guinea. Hyakutake, with the concurrence of General Headquarters, ordered his troops on New Guinea, who were within  of their objective of Port Moresby, to withdraw until the "Guadalcanal matter" was resolved. Hyakutake prepared to send more troops to Guadalcanal for another attempt to recapture Henderson Field.

Allied reinforcement

As the Japanese regrouped west of the Matanikau, the U.S. forces concentrated on shoring up and strengthening their Lunga defenses. On 14 September Vandegrift moved another battalion, the 3rd Battalion, 2nd Marine Regiment from Tulagi to Guadalcanal. On 18 September an Allied naval convoy delivered 4,157 men from the 3rd Provisional Marine Brigade (the 7th Marine Regiment plus a battalion from the 11th Marine Regiment and some additional support units), 137 vehicles, tents, aviation fuel, ammunition, rations, and engineering equipment to Guadalcanal. These crucial reinforcements allowed Vandegrift, beginning on 19 September, to establish an unbroken line of defense around the Lunga perimeter. This left only one Allied aircraft carrier in operation in the South Pacific Area. Vandegrift also made some changes in the senior leadership of his combat units, transferring off the island several officers who did not meet his performance standards and promoting junior officers who had proven themselves to take their place. One of these was the recently promoted Colonel Merritt Edson, who was placed in command of the 5th Marine Regiment.

A lull occurred in the air war over Guadalcanal, with no Japanese air raids between 14 and 27 September because of bad weather, during which both sides reinforced their respective air units. The Japanese delivered 85 fighters and bombers to their air units at Rabaul while the U.S. brought 23 fighters and attack aircraft to Henderson Field. On 20 September the Japanese had 117 total aircraft at Rabaul while the Allies tallied 71 aircraft at Henderson Field. The air war resumed with a Japanese air raid on Guadalcanal on 27 September which was contested by U.S. Navy and Marine fighters from Henderson Field.

The Japanese immediately began to prepare for their next attempt to recapture Henderson Field. The 3rd Battalion, 4th (Aoba) Infantry Regiment had landed at Kamimbo Bay on the western end of Guadalcanal on 11 September, too late to join Kawaguchi's attack but had joined Oka's forces near the Matanikau. Tokyo Express runs by destroyers on 14, 20, 21 and 24 September brought food and ammunition as well as 280 men from the 1st Battalion, Aoba Regiment, to Kamimbo Bay. Meanwhile, the Japanese 2nd and 38th Infantry Divisions were transported from the Dutch East Indies to Rabaul beginning on 13 September. The Japanese planned to transport a total of 17,500 troops from these two divisions to Guadalcanal to take part in the next major attack on the Lunga perimeter by late October.

Actions along the Matanikau

Vandegrift and his staff were aware that Kawaguchi's troops had retreated to the area west of the Matanikau and that numerous groups of Japanese stragglers were scattered throughout the area between the Lunga perimeter and the Matanikau River. Vandegrift therefore decided to conduct another series of small unit operations around the Matanikau Valley. The purpose of these operations was to mop up the scattered groups of Japanese troops east of the Matanikau and to keep the main body of Japanese soldiers off-balance to prevent them from consolidating their positions so close to the main Marine defenses at Lunga Point.

A U.S. Marine operation on Japanese forces west of the Matanikau was conducted between 23 and 27 September by elements of three U.S. Marine battalions. The attack was repulsed by Kawaguchi's troops under Akinosuke Oka's local command. During the action three Marine companies were surrounded by Japanese forces near Point Cruz west of the Matanikau, took heavy losses, and barely escaped with assistance from the destroyer  and landing craft crewed by U.S. Coast Guard personnel. One of those was piloted by Douglas Munro, who was killed as he maneuvered his craft to protect the escaping Marines and became the only Coast Guardsman to be awarded the Medal of Honor.

Between 6 and 9 October a larger force of Marines successfully crossed the Matanikau River, attacked newly landed Japanese forces from the 2nd Infantry Division under the command of Generals Masao Maruyama and Yumio Nasu, and inflicted heavy losses on the Japanese 4th Infantry Regiment. The action forced the Japanese to retreat from their positions east of the Matanikau and hindered Japanese preparations for their planned major offensive on the U.S. Lunga defenses. The raids killed 35 Japanese at a cost of 17 Marines and 3 U.S. Navy personnel killed.

Battle of Cape Esperance

Throughout the last week of September and the first week of October, Tokyo Express runs delivered troops from the Japanese 2nd Infantry Division to Guadalcanal. The Japanese Navy promised to support the Army's planned offensive by delivering the necessary troops, equipment, and supplies to the island, and also by stepping up air attacks on Henderson Field and sending warships to bombard the airfield.

In the meantime, Millard F. Harmon, commander of U.S. Army forces in the South Pacific, convinced Ghormley that U.S. Marine forces on Guadalcanal needed to be reinforced immediately if the Allies were to successfully defend the island from the next expected Japanese offensive. Thus, on 8 October, the 2,837 men of the 164th Infantry Regiment from the Americal Division boarded ships at New Caledonia for the trip to Guadalcanal with a projected arrival date of 13 October. To protect the transports carrying the 164th to Guadalcanal, Ghormley ordered Task Force 64, consisting of four cruisers and five destroyers under U.S. Rear Admiral Norman Scott, to intercept and combat any Japanese ships that approached Guadalcanal and threatened the arrival of the transport convoy.

Mikawa's 8th Fleet staff scheduled a large and important Express run for the night of 11 October. Two seaplane tenders and six destroyers were to deliver 728 soldiers plus artillery and ammunition to Guadalcanal. At the same time, but in a separate operation, three heavy cruisers and two destroyers under the command of Rear Admiral Aritomo Gotō were to bombard Henderson Field with special explosive shells with the object of destroying the CAF and the airfield's facilities. Because U.S. Navy warships had yet to attempt to interdict any Tokyo Express missions to Guadalcanal, the Japanese were not expecting any opposition from Allied naval surface forces that night.

Just before midnight, Scott's warships detected Gotō's force on radar near the entrance to the strait between Savo Island and Guadalcanal. Scott's force was in a position to cross the T on Gotō's unsuspecting formation. Opening fire, Scott's warships sank a cruiser and a destroyer, heavily damaged another cruiser, mortally wounded Gotō, and forced the rest of Gotō's warships to abandon the bombardment mission and retreat. During the exchange of gunfire, one of Scott's destroyers was sunk, and one cruiser and another destroyer were heavily damaged. In the meantime, the Japanese supply convoy successfully completed unloading at Guadalcanal and began its return journey without being discovered by Scott's force. 

Later on the morning of 12 October, four Japanese destroyers from the supply convoy turned back to assist Gotō's retreating, damaged warships. Air attacks by CAF aircraft from Henderson Field sank two of these destroyers later that day. The convoy of U.S. Army troops reached Guadalcanal as scheduled on 13 October and successfully delivered its cargo and passengers to the island.

Henderson Field

Battleship bombardment
Despite the U.S. victory off Cape Esperance, the Japanese continued with plans and preparations for their large offensive scheduled for later in October. The Japanese decided to risk a one-time departure from their usual practice of only using fast warships to deliver their men and materiel to the island. On 13 October, a convoy comprising six cargo ships with eight screening destroyers departed the Shortland Islands for Guadalcanal. The convoy carried 4,500 troops from the 16th and 230th Infantry Regiments, some naval marines, two batteries of heavy artillery, and one company of tanks.

To protect the approaching convoy from attack by CAF aircraft, Yamamoto sent the 3rd Battleship Division, under the command of Takeo Kurita, from Truk to bombard Henderson Field. Over the next one hour and 23 minutes, the two battleships fired 973  shells into the Lunga perimeter, most of which fell in and around the  area of the airfield. Many of the shells were fragmentation shells, specifically designed to destroy land targets. The bombardment heavily damaged both runways, burned almost all of the available aviation fuel, destroyed 48 of the CAF's 90 aircraft, and killed 41 men, including six CAF pilots. The battleship force immediately returned to Truk.

Despite the heavy damage, Henderson personnel were able to restore one of the runways to operational condition within a few hours. Seventeen SBD-3 Dauntless dive bombers and 20 F4F Wildcats at Espiritu Santo were quickly flown to Henderson, and U.S. Army and Marine transport aircraft shuttled aviation gasoline from Espiritu Santo to Guadalcanal. Aware of the approach of the large Japanese reinforcement convoy, the U.S. desperately sought a way to interdict the convoy before it could reach Guadalcanal. Using fuel drained from destroyed aircraft and from a cache in the nearby jungle, the CAF attacked the convoy twice on 14 October but caused no damage.

The Japanese convoy reached Tassafaronga Point at midnight on 14 October and began unloading. Throughout the day of 15 October, a string of CAF aircraft from Henderson bombed and strafed the unloading convoy, destroying three of the cargo ships. The remainder of the convoy departed that night, having unloaded all of the troops and about two-thirds of the supplies and equipment. Several Japanese heavy cruisers also bombarded Henderson on the nights of 14 and 15 October, destroying a few additional CAF aircraft but failing to cause significant further damage to the airfield.

Battle for Henderson Field

Between 1 and 17 October, the Japanese delivered 15,000 troops to Guadalcanal, giving Hyakutake 20,000 total troops to employ for his planned offensive. Because of the loss of their positions on the east side of the Matanikau, the Japanese decided that an attack on the U.S. defenses along the coast would be prohibitively difficult. Therefore, Hyakutake decided that the main thrust of his planned attack would be from south of Henderson Field. His 2nd Division (augmented by troops from the 38th Division), under Maruyama and comprising 7,000 soldiers in three infantry regiments of three battalions each was ordered to march through the jungle and attack the American defenses from the south near the east bank of the Lunga River. The date of the attack was set for 22 October, then changed to 23 October. To distract the Americans from the planned attack from the south, Hyakutake's heavy artillery plus five battalions of infantry (about 2,900 men) under Major General Tadashi Sumiyoshi were to attack the American defenses from the west along the coastal corridor. The Japanese estimated that there were 10,000 American troops on the island, when in fact there were about 23,000.

On 12 October, a company of Japanese engineers began to break a trail, called the "Maruyama Road", from the Matanikau towards the southern portion of the U.S. Lunga perimeter. The  trail traversed some of the most difficult terrain on Guadalcanal, including numerous rivers and streams, deep, muddy ravines, steep ridges, and dense jungle. Between 16 and 18 October, the 2nd Division began their march along the Maruyama Road.

By 23 October, Maruyama's forces still struggled through the jungle to reach the American lines. That evening, after learning that his forces had yet to reach their attack positions, Hyakutake postponed the attack to 19:00 on 24 October. The Americans remained unaware of the approach of Maruyama's forces.

Sumiyoshi was informed by Hyakutake's staff of the postponement of the offensive to 24 October, but he was unable to contact his troops to inform them of the delay. Thus, at dusk on 23 October, two battalions of the 4th Infantry Regiment and the nine tanks of the 1st Independent Tank Company launched attacks on the U.S. Marine defenses at the mouth of the Matanikau. U.S. Marine artillery, cannon, and small arms fire repulsed the attacks, destroying all the tanks and killing many of the Japanese soldiers while suffering only light casualties.

Finally, late on 24 October, Maruyama's forces reached the Lunga perimeter. Over two consecutive nights Maruyama's forces conducted numerous frontal assaults on positions defended by troops of the 1st Battalion, 7th Marines under Lieutenant Colonel Chesty Puller and the U.S. Army's 3rd Battalion, 164th Infantry Regiment, commanded by Lieutenant Colonel Robert Hall. U.S. Marine and Army units armed with rifles, machine guns, mortars, and artillery, including direct canister fire from 37 mm anti-tank guns, "wrought terrible carnage" on the Japanese. A few small groups of Japanese broke through the American defenses but were hunted down and killed over the next several days. More than 1,500 of Maruyama's troops were killed in the attacks while the Americans lost about 60 killed. Over the same two days American aircraft from Henderson Field defended against attacks by Japanese aircraft and ships, destroying 14 aircraft and sinking a light cruiser.

Further Japanese attacks near the Matanikau on 26 October were also repulsed with heavy losses for the Japanese. As a result, by 08:00 on 26 October, Hyakutake called off any further attacks and ordered his forces to retreat. About half of Maruyama's survivors were ordered to retreat back to the upper Matanikau Valley while the 230th Infantry Regiment under Colonel Toshinari Shōji was told to head for Koli Point, east of the Lunga perimeter. Leading elements of the 2nd Division reached the 17th Army headquarters area at Kokumbona, west of the Matanikau on 4 November. The same day, Shōji's unit reached Koli Point and made camp. Decimated by battle deaths, combat injuries, malnutrition, and tropical diseases, the 2nd Division was incapable of further offensive action and fought as a defensive force along the coast for the rest of the campaign. In total, the Japanese lost 2,200–3,000 troops in the battle while the Americans lost around 80 killed.

Battle of the Santa Cruz Islands

At the same time that Hyakutake's troops were attacking the Lunga perimeter, Japanese aircraft carriers and other large warships under the overall direction of Yamamoto moved into a position near the southern Solomon Islands. From this location, the Japanese naval forces hoped to engage and decisively defeat any Allied (primarily U.S.) naval forces, especially carrier forces, that responded to Hyakutake's ground offensive. Allied naval carrier forces in the area, under the overall command of William Halsey Jr., also hoped to meet the Japanese naval forces in battle. Nimitz had replaced Ghormley with Admiral Halsey on 18 October after concluding that Ghormley had become too pessimistic and myopic to effectively continue leading Allied forces in the South Pacific Area.

The two opposing carrier forces confronted each other on the morning of 26 October, in what became known as the Battle of the Santa Cruz Islands. After an exchange of carrier air attacks, Allied surface ships were forced to retreat from the battle area with the loss of one carrier sunk (Hornet) and another heavily damaged. The participating Japanese carrier forces, however, also retired because of high aircraft and aircrew losses and significant damage to two carriers. Although an apparent tactical victory for the Japanese in terms of ships sunk and damaged, the loss by the Japanese of many irreplaceable, veteran aircrews provided a long-term strategic advantage for the Allies, whose aircrew losses in the battle were relatively low. The Japanese carriers played no further significant role in the campaign.

November land actions

In order to exploit the victory in the Battle for Henderson Field, Vandegrift sent six Marine battalions, later joined by one Army battalion, on an offensive west of the Matanikau. The operation was commanded by Merritt Edson and its goal was to capture Kokumbona, headquarters of the 17th Army, west of Point Cruz. Defending the Point Cruz area were Japanese army troops from the 4th Infantry Regiment commanded by Nomasu Nakaguma. The 4th Infantry was severely understrength because of battle damage, tropical disease, and malnutrition.

The American offensive began on 1 November and, after some difficulty, succeeded in destroying Japanese forces defending the Point Cruz area by 3 November, including rear echelon troops sent to reinforce Nakaguma's battered regiment. The Americans appeared to be on the verge of breaking through the Japanese defenses and capturing Kokumbona. At this time, however, other American forces discovered and engaged newly landed Japanese troops near Koli Point on the eastern side of the Lunga perimeter. To counter this new threat, Vandegrift temporarily halted the Matanikau offensive on 4 November. The Americans suffered 71 killed and the Japanese around 400 killed in the offensive.

At Koli Point early in the morning 3 November, five Japanese destroyers delivered 300 army troops to support Shōji and his troops who were en route to Koli Point after the Battle for Henderson Field. Having learned of the planned landing, Vandegrift sent a battalion of Marines under Herman H. Hanneken to intercept the Japanese at Koli. Soon after landing, the Japanese soldiers encountered and drove Hanneken's battalion back towards the Lunga perimeter. In response, Vandegrift ordered Puller's Marine battalion plus two of the 164th infantry battalions, along with Hanneken's battalion, to move towards Koli Point to attack the Japanese forces there.

As the American troops began to move, Shōji and his soldiers began to arrive at Koli Point. Beginning on 8 November, the American troops attempted to encircle Shōji's forces at Gavaga Creek near Koli Point. Meanwhile, Hyakutake ordered Shōji to abandon his positions at Koli and rejoin Japanese forces at Kokumbona in the Matanikau area. A gap existed by way of a swampy creek in the southern side of the American lines. Between 9 and 11 November, Shōji and between 2,000 and 3,000 of his men escaped into the jungle to the south. On 12 November, the Americans completely overran and killed all the remaining Japanese soldiers left in the pocket. The Americans counted the bodies of 450–475 Japanese dead in the Koli Point area and captured most of Shōji's heavy weapons and provisions. The American forces suffered 40 killed and 120 wounded in the operation.

Carlson's raiders, along with troops from the Army's 147th Infantry Regiment, were to provide security for 500 Seabees as they attempted to construct an airfield at that location. Halsey, acting on a recommendation by Turner, had approved the Aola Bay airfield construction effort; however it was abandoned at the end of November because of unsuitable terrain.

On 5 November, Vandegrift ordered Carlson and his raiders to march overland from Aola and attack any of Shōji's forces that had escaped from Koli Point. With the rest of the companies from his battalion, which arrived a few days later, Carlson and his troops set off on a 29-day patrol from Aola to the Lunga perimeter. During the patrol, the raiders fought several battles with Shōji's retreating forces, killing almost 500 of them, while suffering 16 killed. Tropical diseases and a lack of food felled many more of Shōji's men. By the time Shōji's forces reached the Lunga River in mid-November, about halfway to the Matanikau, only 1,300 men remained with the main body. When Shōji reached the 17th Army positions west of the Matanikau, only 700 to 800 survivors were still with him. Most of the survivors from Shōji's force joined other Japanese units defending the Mount Austen and upper Matanikau River area.

Tokyo Express runs on 5, 7, and 9 November delivered additional troops from the Japanese 38th Infantry Division, including most of the 228th Infantry Regiment. These fresh troops were quickly emplaced in the Point Cruz and Matanikau area and helped successfully resist further attacks by American forces on 10 and 18 November. The Americans and Japanese remained facing each other along a line just west of Point Cruz for the next six weeks.

Naval Battle of Guadalcanal

After the defeat in the Battle for Henderson Field, the IJA planned to try again to retake the airfield in November 1942, but further reinforcements were needed before the operation could proceed. The IJA requested assistance from Yamamoto to deliver the needed reinforcements to the island and to support the next offensive. Yamamoto provided 11 large transport ships to carry the remaining 7,000 troops from the 38th Infantry Division, their ammunition, food, and heavy equipment from Rabaul to Guadalcanal. The warship force was commanded from Hiei by recently promoted Vice Admiral Hiroaki Abe.

In early November, Allied intelligence learned that the Japanese were preparing again to try to retake Henderson Field. In response the U.S. sent Task Force 67, a large reinforcement and resupply convoy carrying Marine replacements, two U.S. Army infantry battalions, and ammunition and food, commanded by Turner, to Guadalcanal on 11 November. The supply ships were protected by two task groups, commanded by Rear Admirals Daniel J. Callaghan and Norman Scott, and aircraft from Henderson Field. The ships were attacked several times on 11 and 12 November by Japanese aircraft from Rabaul staging through an air base at Buin, Bougainville, but most were unloaded without serious damage.

U.S. reconnaissance aircraft spotted the approach of Abe's bombardment force and passed a warning to the Allied command. Thus warned, Turner detached all usable combat ships under Callaghan to protect the troops ashore from the expected Japanese naval attack and troop landing and ordered the supply ships at Guadalcanal to depart by early evening 12 November. Callaghan's force comprised two heavy cruisers, three light cruisers, and eight destroyers.

Around 01:30 on 13 November, Callaghan's force intercepted Abe's bombardment group between Guadalcanal and Savo Island. In addition to the two battleships, Abe's force included one light cruiser and 11 destroyers. In the pitch darkness the two warship forces intermingled before opening fire at unusually close quarters. In the resulting mêlée, Abe's warships sank or severely damaged all but one cruiser and one destroyer in Callaghan's force; both Callaghan and Scott were killed. Two Japanese destroyers were sunk, and another destroyer and the Hiei heavily damaged. Despite his defeat of Callaghan's force, Abe ordered his warships to retire without bombarding Henderson Field. The Hiei sank later that day after repeated air attacks by aircraft from CAF and the carrier Enterprise. Because of Abe's failure to neutralize Henderson Field, Yamamoto ordered the troop transport convoy, under the command of Tanaka and located near the Shortland Islands, to wait an additional day before heading towards Guadalcanal. Yamamoto ordered Nobutake Kondō to assemble another bombardment force using warships from Truk and Abe's force to attack Henderson Field on 15 November.

In the meantime, around 02:00 on 14 November, a cruiser and destroyer force under Gunichi Mikawa from Rabaul conducted an unopposed bombardment of Henderson Field. The bombardment caused some damage but failed to put the airfield or most of its aircraft out of operation. As Mikawa's force retired towards Rabaul, Tanaka's transport convoy, trusting that Henderson Field was destroyed or heavily damaged, began its run down the slot towards Guadalcanal. Throughout the day of 14 November, aircraft from Henderson Field and the Enterprise attacked Mikawa's and Tanaka's ships, sinking one heavy cruiser and seven of the transports. Most of the troops were rescued from the transports by Tanaka's escorting destroyers and returned to the Shortlands. After dark, Tanaka and the remaining four transports continued towards Guadalcanal as Kondo's force approached to bombard Henderson Field.

The U.S. force, under the command of Willis A. Lee aboard the Washington, reached Guadalcanal and Savo Island just before midnight on 14 November, shortly before Kondo's bombardment force arrived. Kondo's force consisted of the Kirishima plus two heavy cruisers, two light cruisers, and nine destroyers. After the two forces made contact, Kondo's force quickly sank three of the U.S. destroyers and heavily damaged the fourth. The Japanese warships then sighted, opened fire, and damaged the South Dakota. As Kondo's warships concentrated on the South Dakota, the Washington approached the Japanese ships unobserved and opened fire on the Kirishima, smashing into the Japanese battleship repeatedly with both main and secondary battery shells and causing fatal damage. After fruitlessly chasing the Washington towards the Russell Islands, Kondo ordered his warships to retire without bombarding Henderson Field. One of Kondo's destroyers was also sunk during the engagement.

As Kondo's ships retired, the four Japanese transports beached near Tassafaronga Point on Guadalcanal at 04:00. At 05:55, U.S. aircraft and artillery began attacking the beached transports, destroying all four, along with most of the supplies that they carried. Only 2,000–3,000 of the army troops reached the shore. Because of the failure to deliver most of the troops and supplies, the Japanese were forced to cancel their planned November offensive on Henderson Field, making the battle a significant strategic victory for the Allies and marking the beginning of the end of Japanese attempts to retake Henderson Field.

On 26 November, Japanese Lieutenant General Hitoshi Imamura took command of the newly formed Eighth Area Army at Rabaul. The new command encompassed both Hyakutake's 17th Army and the 18th Army in New Guinea. One of Imamura's first priorities upon assuming command was the continuation of the attempts to retake Henderson Field and Guadalcanal. The Allied offensive at Buna in New Guinea, however, changed Imamura's priorities. Because the Allied attempt to take Buna was considered a more severe threat to Rabaul, Imamura postponed further major reinforcement efforts to Guadalcanal to concentrate on the situation in New Guinea.

Battle of Tassafaronga

The Japanese continued to experience problems in delivering sufficient supplies to sustain their troops on Guadalcanal. Attempts to use only submarines the last two weeks in November failed to provide sufficient food for Hyakutake's forces. A separate attempt to establish bases in the central Solomons to facilitate barge convoys to Guadalcanal also failed because of destructive Allied air attacks. On 26 November, the 17th Army notified Imamura that it faced a food crisis. Some front-line units had not been resupplied for six days, and even the rear-area troops were on one-third rations. The situation forced the Japanese to return to using destroyers to deliver the necessary supplies.

Eighth Fleet personnel devised a plan to help reduce the exposure of destroyers delivering supplies to Guadalcanal. Large oil or gas drums were cleaned and filled with medical supplies and food, with enough air space to provide buoyancy, and strung together with rope. When the destroyers arrived at Guadalcanal they would make a sharp turn and the drums would be cut loose, and a swimmer or boat from shore could pick up the buoyed end of a rope and return it to the beach, where the soldiers could haul in the supplies.

The Eighth Fleet's Guadalcanal Reinforcement Unit (the Tokyo Express), commanded by Tanaka, was tasked by Mikawa with making the first of five scheduled runs to Tassafaronga using the drum method on the night of 30 November. Tanaka's unit was centered on eight destroyers, with six destroyers assigned to carry between 200 and 240 drums of supplies apiece. Notified by intelligence sources of the Japanese supply attempt, Halsey ordered the newly formed Task Force 67, comprising four cruisers and four destroyers under the command of Rear Admiral Carleton H. Wright, to intercept Tanaka's force off Guadalcanal. Two additional destroyers joined Wright's force en route to Guadalcanal from Espiritu Santo during the day of 30 November.

At 22:40 on 30 November, Tanaka's force arrived off Guadalcanal and prepared to unload the supply barrels. Meanwhile, Wright's warships were approaching through Ironbottom Sound from the opposite direction. Wright's destroyers detected Tanaka's force on radar, and the destroyer commander requested permission to attack with torpedoes. Wright waited four minutes before giving permission, allowing Tanaka's force to escape from an optimum firing setup. All of the American torpedoes missed their targets. At the same time, Wright's cruisers opened fire, hitting and destroying one of the Japanese guard destroyers. The rest of Tanaka's warships abandoned the supply mission, increased speed, turned, and launched a total of 44 torpedoes in the direction of Wright's cruisers. The rest of Tanaka's destroyers escaped without damage but failed to deliver any of the provisions to Guadalcanal.

By 7 December 1942, Hyakutake's forces were losing about 50 men each day from malnutrition, disease, and Allied ground or air attacks. Further attempts by Tanaka's destroyer forces to deliver provisions on 3, 7 and 11 December failed to alleviate the crisis, and one of Tanaka's destroyers was sunk by a U.S. PT boat torpedo.

Japanese decision to withdraw

On 12 December, the Japanese Navy proposed that Guadalcanal be abandoned. At the same time, several army staff officers at the Imperial General Headquarters (IGH) also suggested that further efforts to retake Guadalcanal would be impossible. A delegation led by Colonel Joichiro Sanada, chief of the IGH's operations section, visited Rabaul on 19 December and consulted Imamura and his staff. Upon the delegation's return to Tokyo, Sanada recommended that Guadalcanal be abandoned. The IGH's top leaders agreed with Sanada's recommendation on 26 December and ordered their staffs to begin drafting plans for a withdrawal from Guadalcanal, establishment of a new defense line in the central Solomons, and shifting priorities and resources to the campaign in New Guinea.

On 28 December, General Hajime Sugiyama and Admiral Osami Nagano personally informed Emperor Hirohito of the decision to withdraw from Guadalcanal. On 31 December, Hirohito formally endorsed the decision. The Japanese secretly began to prepare for the evacuation, called Operation Ke, scheduled to begin during the latter part of January 1943.

Battle of Mount Austen, the Galloping Horse, and the Sea Horse

By December, the weary 1st Marine Division was withdrawn for recuperation, and over the course of the next month the U.S. XIV Corps took over operations on the island. This corps consisted of the 2nd Marine Division and the U.S. Army's 25th Infantry and 23rd "Americal" Divisions. U.S. Army Major General Alexander Patch replaced Vandegrift as commander of Allied forces on Guadalcanal, which by January totaled just over 50,000 men.

On 18 December, Allied (mainly U.S. Army) forces began attacking Japanese positions on Mount Austen. A strong Japanese fortified position, called the Gifu, stymied the attacks and the Americans were forced to temporarily halt their offensive on 4 January. The Allies renewed the offensive on 10 January, attacking the Japanese on Mount Austen as well as on two nearby ridges called the Sea Horse and the Galloping Horse. After some difficulty, the Allies captured all three by 23 January. At the same time, U.S. Marines advanced along the north coast of the island, making significant gains. The Americans lost about 250 killed in the operation while the Japanese suffered around 3,000 killed, about 12 to 1 in the Americans' favor.

Ke evacuation

On 14 January, a Tokyo Express run delivered a battalion of troops to act as a rear guard for the Ke evacuation. A staff officer from Rabaul accompanied the troops to notify Hyakutake of the decision to withdraw. At the same time, Japanese warships and aircraft moved into position around the Rabaul and Bougainville areas in preparation to execute the withdrawal operation. Allied intelligence detected the Japanese movements but misinterpreted them as preparations for another attempt to retake Henderson Field and Guadalcanal.

Patch, wary of what he thought to be an imminent Japanese offensive, committed only a relatively small portion of his troops to continue a slow-moving offensive against Hyakutake's forces. On 29 January, Halsey, acting on the same intelligence, sent a resupply convoy to Guadalcanal screened by a cruiser task force. Sighting the cruisers, Japanese naval torpedo bombers attacked that same evening and heavily damaged the cruiser . The next day, more torpedo aircraft attacked and sank Chicago. Halsey ordered the remainder of the task force to return to base and directed the rest of his naval forces to take station in the Coral Sea, south of Guadalcanal, to be ready to counter a Japanese offensive.

In the meantime, the Japanese 17th Army withdrew to the west coast of Guadalcanal while rear guard units checked the American offensive. On the night of 1 February, a force of 20 destroyers from Mikawa's 8th Fleet under Shintarō Hashimoto successfully extracted 4,935 soldiers, mainly from the 38th Division, from the island. The Japanese and Americans each lost a destroyer from an air and naval attack related to the evacuation mission.

On the nights of 4 and 7 February, Hashimoto and his destroyers evacuated the remaining Japanese forces from Guadalcanal. Apart from some air attacks, Allied forces were still anticipating a large Japanese offensive and did not attempt to interdict Hashimoto's evacuation runs. In total, the Japanese successfully evacuated 10,652 men from Guadalcanal. Their last troops left the island on the evening of 7 February, six months to the day from when the U.S. forces first landed. Two days later, on 9 February, Patch realized that the Japanese were gone and declared Guadalcanal secure.

Aftermath

After the Japanese withdrawal, Guadalcanal and Tulagi were developed into major bases supporting the Allied advance further up the Solomon Islands chain. Besides Henderson Field, two additional fighter runways were constructed at Lunga Point, and a bomber airfield was built at Koli Point. Extensive naval port and logistics facilities were established at Guadalcanal, Tulagi, and Florida. The anchorage around Tulagi became an important forward base for Allied warships and transport ships supporting the Solomon Islands campaign. Major ground units were staged through large encampments and barracks on Guadalcanal before deployment further up the Solomons.

After Guadalcanal the Japanese were clearly on the defensive in the Pacific. The constant pressure to reinforce Guadalcanal had weakened Japanese efforts in other theaters, contributing to a successful Australian and American counteroffensive in New Guinea which culminated in the capture of the key bases of Buna and Gona in early 1943. The Allies had gained a strategic initiative which they never relinquished. In June, the Allies launched Operation Cartwheel which, after modification in August 1943, formalized the strategy of isolating Rabaul and cutting its sea lines of communication. The subsequent successful neutralization of Rabaul and the forces centered there facilitated the South West Pacific campaign under MacArthur and Central Pacific island-hopping campaign under Nimitz, with both efforts successfully advancing toward Japan. The remaining Japanese defenses in the South Pacific Area were then either destroyed or bypassed by Allied forces as the war progressed.

Significance

Resources
 

The Battle of Guadalcanal was one of the first prolonged campaigns in the Pacific Ocean theater of World War II. It strained logistical capabilities of the combatant nations. For the U.S., this need prompted the development of effective combat air transport for the first time. A failure to achieve air supremacy forced Japan to rely on reinforcement by barges, destroyers, and submarines, with very uneven results. Early in the campaign, the Americans were hindered by a lack of resources, as they suffered heavy losses in cruisers and carriers, with replacements from ramped-up shipbuilding programs still months away from materializing.

The U.S. Navy suffered such high personnel losses during the campaign that it refused to publicly release total casualty figures for years. However, as the campaign continued, and the American public became more and more aware of the plight and perceived heroism of the American forces on Guadalcanal, more forces were dispatched to the area. This spelled trouble for Japan as its military-industrial complex was unable to match the output of American industry and manpower. Thus, as the campaign wore on the Japanese were losing irreplaceable units while the Americans were rapidly replacing and even augmenting their forces.

The Guadalcanal campaign was costly to Japan strategically and in material losses and manpower. Roughly 30,000 personnel, including 25,000 experienced ground troops, died during the campaign. As many as three-quarters of the deaths were from non-combat causes such as starvation and various tropical diseases. The drain on resources directly contributed to Japan's failure to achieve its objectives in the New Guinea campaign. Japan also lost control of the southern Solomons and the ability to interdict Allied shipping to Australia. Japan's major base at Rabaul became further directly threatened by Allied air power. Most importantly, scarce Japanese land, air, and naval forces had disappeared forever into the Guadalcanal jungle and surrounding sea. The Japanese could not replace the aircraft destroyed and ships sunk in this campaign, as well as their highly trained and veteran crews, especially the naval aircrews, nearly as quickly as the Allies.

Strategy
While the Battle of Midway is viewed as a turning point in the Pacific War, Japan remained on the offensive, as shown by its advances down the Solomon Islands. Only after the Allied victories in Guadalcanal and New Guinea (at Milne Bay and Buna–Gona) were these large-scale Japanese offensive actions stopped. Strategic initiative passed to the Allies, as it proved, permanently. The Guadalcanal campaign ended all Japanese expansion attempts in the Pacific and placed the Allies in a position of clear supremacy. The Allied victory at Guadalcanal was the first step in a long string of successes that eventually led to the surrender and occupation of Japan.

The "Europe first" policy agreed to by the Allies had initially only allowed for defensive actions against Japanese expansion in order to focus resources on defeating Germany. However, Admiral King's argument for the Guadalcanal invasion, as well as its successful implementation, convinced Roosevelt that the Pacific Theater could be pursued offensively as well. By the end of 1942, it was clear that Japan had lost the Guadalcanal campaign, a serious blow to Japan's strategic plans for the defense of their empire and an unanticipated defeat at the hands of the Americans.

Perhaps as important as the military victory for the Allies was the psychological victory. On a level playing field, the Allies had beaten Japan's best land, air, and naval forces. After Guadalcanal, Allied personnel regarded the Japanese military with much less fear and awe than previously. In addition, the Allies viewed the eventual outcome of the Pacific War with greatly increased optimism.

Tokyo Express no longer has terminus on Guadalcanal.
 —Major General Alexander Patch, USA, Commander, U.S. Forces on Guadalcanal

Guadalcanal is no longer merely a name of an island in Japanese military history. It is the name of the graveyard of the Japanese army.
— Major General Kiyotake Kawaguchi, IJA, Commander, 35th Infantry Brigade at Guadalcanal

Beyond Kawaguchi, several Japanese political and military leaders, including Naoki Hoshino, Nagano, and Torashirō Kawabe, stated shortly after the war that Guadalcanal was the decisive turning point in the conflict. Said Kawabe, "As for the turning point [of the war], when the positive action ceased or even became negative, it was, I feel, at Guadalcanal."

Vilu War Museum and Guadalcanal American Memorial
The remains of military equipment and of several aircraft can be seen in the open-air museum. Several memorials for the American, Australian, Fijian, New Zealand and Japanese soldiers who lost their lives are erected there.

To mark the 50th anniversary of the Red Beach landings, the Guadalcanal American Memorial was dedicated in Honiara on 7 August 1992.

Remaining ordnance 

An unknown amount of unexploded bombs from the battle remain on the island, and residents of the island have been killed and severely injured by unexpected explosions from hidden explosives. The threat to people's lives from unexploded bombs remain high. The Solomon Islands police force has disposed most of the discovered bombs; however, clearance work is expensive, and the island does not have sufficient resources to clear the remaining explosives. The Solomon Islands have urged both the U.S. and Japanese governments to clear the remaining bombs from the island. In 2012, 18 years after the U.S. ended its aid program in the South Pacific, the U.S. provided funds to assist efforts to find and remove unexploded bombs. Australia and Norway also established programs to help the Solomon Islands remove unexploded bombs.

News reporting
The Guadalcanal campaign was the subject of a large amount of high-quality reporting. News agencies sent some of their most talented writers, as it was the first major American offensive combat operation of the war. Richard Tregaskis who wrote for International News Service gained fame with the publication of his bestselling Guadalcanal Diary in 1943. Hanson Baldwin, a Navy correspondent, filed stories for The New York Times and won a Pulitzer Prize for his coverage of the early days of World War II. Tom Yarbrough wrote for the Associated Press, Bob Miller for the United Press, John Hersey for Time and Life, Ira Wolfert for the North American Newspaper Alliance (his series of articles about the November 1942 Naval Battle of Guadalcanal won him a Pulitzer Prize), Sergeant James Hurlbut for the Marine Corps, and Mack Morriss for Yank magazine. Commander Vandegrift placed few restrictions on the reporters who were generally allowed to go wherever they wanted and write what they wanted.

Notes

References

Books

 Alexander, Joseph H. Edson's Raiders: The 1st Marine Raider Battalion in World War II. Annapolis, MD: Naval Institute Press, 2000.  
 Armstrong, William M. Marine Air Group 25 and SCAT (Images of Aviation). Charleston, SC: Arcadia, 2017. .
 Bergerud, Eric M. Touched with Fire: The Land War in the South Pacific. New York: Penguin Books, 1997.  
 Clemens, Martin. Alone on Guadalcanal: A Coastwatcher's Story. Annapolis, MD: Naval Institute Press, 2004.  
 
 Crenshaw, Russell Sydnor. South Pacific Destroyer: The Battle for the Solomons from Savo Island to Vella Gulf. Annapolis, MD: Naval Institute Press, 1998.  
 D'Albas, Andrieu. Death of a Navy: Japanese Naval Action in World War II. New York: Devin-Adair Co., 1957. 
 
 Dull, Paul S. A Battle History of the Imperial Japanese Navy, 1941–1945. Annapolis, MD: Naval Institute Press, 1978.  
 Evans, David C. The Japanese Navy in World War II: In the Words of Former Japanese Naval Officers. Annapolis, MD: Naval Institute Press, 1986.  
 
 Frank, Richard. Guadalcanal: The Definitive Account of the Landmark Battle. New York: Random House, 1990.  
 Gilbert, Oscar E. Marine Tank Battles of the Pacific. Conshohocken, PA: Combined Pub., 2001.  
 Griffith, Samuel B. The Battle for Guadalcanal. Champaign, IL: University of Illinois Press, 2000.  
 Hadden, Robert Lee. 2007. "The Geology of Guadalcanal: a Selected Bibliography of the Geology, Natural History, and the History of Guadalcanal." Alexandria, VA: Topographic Engineering Center. 360 pages. Lists sources of information regarding the bodies of the US Marines of the Lt Col. Frank B. Goettge Reconnaissance patrol that was ambushed in August 1942.
 Hammel, Eric. Carrier Clash: The Invasion of Guadalcanal & The Battle of the Eastern Solomons August 1942. St. Paul, MN: Zenith Press, 2004.  
 Hammel, Eric. Carrier Strike: The Battle of the Santa Cruz Islands, October 1942. Pacifica, CA: Pacifica Press, 2000.  
 Hammel, Eric.  Guadalcanal: Decision at Sea: The Naval Battle of Guadalcanal, November 13–15, 1942.  New York: Crown, 1988. .
 Hara, Tameichi. Japanese Destroyer Captain. New York: Ballantine Books, 1961. 
 Hayashi, Saburo. Kogun: The Japanese Army in the Pacific War. Quantico: Marine Corps Association, 1959. 
 Hornfischer, James D. Neptune's Inferno: The U.S. Navy at Guadalcanal.  New York: Bantam Books, 2011  
 
 Jersey, Stanley Coleman. Hell's Islands: The Untold Story of Guadalcanal. College Station: Texas A&M University Press, 2008.  
 
 Kilpatrick, C. W. Naval Night Battles of the Solomons. Pompano Beach, FL: Exposition Press of Florida, 1987.  
 Leckie, Robert. Helmet for my Pillow. [S.l.]: Ibooks, 2006.  
 Loxton, Bruce and Chris Coulthard-Clark. The Shame of Savo: Anatomy of a Naval Disaster.  St. Leonards, N.S.W.: Allen & Unwin, 1997.  
 Lundstrom, John B. The First Team and the Guadalcanal Campaign: Naval Fighter Combat from August to November 1942. Annapolis, MD: Naval Institute Press, 2005.  
 Manchester, William. Goodbye, Darkness A Memoir of the Pacific. Boston: Little, Brown and Company, 1980.  
 McGee, William L. The Solomons Campaigns, 1942–1943: From Guadalcanal to Bougainville – Pacific War Turning Point, Volume 2. Santa Barbara, CA: BMC Publications, 2002.  
 Miller, Thomas G. The Cactus Air Force. Fredericksburg, TX: Admiral Nimitz Foundation, 1969. 
 Morison, Samuel Eliot The Struggle for Guadalcanal, August 1942 – February 1943, vol. V of History of United States Naval Operations in World War II. Boston: Little, Brown and Company, 1969. 
 Morison, Samuel Eliot, Breaking the Bismarcks Barrier, 22 July 1942 – 1 May 1944, vol. VI of History of United States Naval Operations in World War II.  Boston:  Little, Brown and Company 1950. 
 Murray, Williamson and Allan R. Millett A War To Be Won: Fighting the Second World War. Cambridge, MA: Belknap Press of Harvard University Press, 2000.  
 Peatross, Oscar F. Bless 'em All: The Raider Marines of World War II. Irvine, CA: ReView Publications, 1995.  
 Rottman, Gordon L. Japanese Army in World War II: The South Pacific and New Guinea, 1942–43. Oxford: Osprey, 2005.  
 Smith, Michael T. Bloody Ridge: The Battle That Saved Guadalcanal. Novato, CA: Pocket Books, 2003.  
 Toland, John The Rising Sun: The Decline and Fall of the Japanese Empire, 1936–1945. New York: Modern Library, 2003.

Web

Further reading

Books

 
 Braun, Saul M. The Struggle for Guadalcanal (American Battles and Campaigns). New York: Putnam, 1969. 
 Christ, James F. Battalion of the Damned: The 1st Marine Paratroopers at Gavutu and Bloody Ridge, 1942. Annapolis, MD: Naval Institute Press, 2007.  
 Coggins, Jack The Campaign for Guadalcanal: A Battle That Made History. Garden City, NY: Doubleday and Co., 1972.  
 Crawford, John   New Zealand's Pacific Frontline: Guadalcanal–Solomon Islands Campaign, 1942–45. [New Zealand]: New Zealand Defence Force, 1992.  
 DeBlanc, Jefferson Guadalcanal Air War: Col. Jefferson DeBlanc's Story. Gretna, LA: Pelican Pub., 2008.   
 Farrington, Arthur C. The Leatherneck Boys: A Pfc at the Battle for Guadalcanal. Manhattan, KS: Sunflower University Press, 1995.  
 Feldt, Eric Augustus. The Coastwatchers. Ringwood, Victoria, Australia: Penguin Books, 1991.  
 Hersey, John Into the Valley: Marines at Guadalcanal. Lincoln: University of Nebraska Press, 2002.  
 Hoyt, Edwin P. Guadalcanal. New York: Military Heritage Press, 1988.   
 Hubler, Richard G., and John A. Dechant. Flying Leathernecks. Garden City, New York: Doubleday, Doran & Co., 1944. 
 
 Leckie, Robert Challenge for the Pacific: The Bloody Six-Month Battle Of Guadalcanal. New York: Da Capo Press, 1999.  
 
 Lord, Walter. Lonely Vigil: Coastwatchers of the Solomons. Annapolis, MD: Naval Institute Press, 2006.  
 Lundstrom, John B.  Black Shoe Carrier Admiral: Frank Jack Fletcher at Coral Seas, Midway & Guadalcanal. Annapolis, MD: Naval Institute Press, 2006.  
 Marion, Ore J., Thomas Cuddihy and Edward Cuddihy. On the Canal: The Marines of L-3-5 on Guadalcanal, 1942. Mechanicsburg, PA: Stackpole Books, 2004.  
 Merillat, Herbert Christian. Guadalcanal Remembered. Tuscaloosa: University Alabama Press, 2003  
 Merillat, Herbert L. The Island: A History of the First Marine Division on Guadalcanal, 7 August – 9 December 1942. Boston: Houghton Mifflin Company, 1944. 
 Mueller, Joseph. Guadalcanal 1942: The Marines Strike Back. London: Osprey, 1992.  
 Parkin, Robert Sinclair. Blood on the Sea: American Destroyers Lost in World War II. Cambridge, MA: Da Capo Press, 1995.  
 Poor, Henry V., Henry A. Mustin and Colin G. Jameson. The Battles of Cape Esperance, 11 October 1942 and Santa Cruz Islands, 26 October 1942. Washington, DC: Naval Historical Center, 1994.  
 Radike, Floyd W. Across the Dark Islands: The War in the Pacific. New York: Presidio, 2003.  
 Richter, Don. Where the Sun Stood Still: The Untold Story of Sir Jacob Vouza and the Guadalcanal Campaign. Calabasas, CA: Toucan Pub., 1992.  
 Rose, Lisle Abbott. The Ship that Held the Line: The USS Hornet and the First Year of the Pacific War.  Annapolis, MD: Naval Institute Press, 2002.  
 Rottman, Gordon L. and Duncan Anderson. U.S. Marine Corps Pacific Theater of Operations 1941–43. Oxford: Osprey, 2004.  
 Smith, George W. The Do-or-Die Men: The 1st Marine Raider Battalion at Guadalcanal. New York: Pocket Books, 2003.   
 Stafford, Edward Peary. The Big E: The Story of the USS Enterprise. Annapolis, MD: Naval Institute Press, 2002.  
 
 Twining, Merrill B. No Bended Knee: The Battle for Guadalcanal. Novato, CA.: Presidio, 1996.  
 Ulbrich, David J. Preparing for Victory: Thomas Holcomb and the Making of the Modern Marine Corps, 1936–1943. Annapolis, MD: Naval Institute Press, 2011.   
 Walker, Charles H. Combat Officer: A Memoir of War in the South Pacific. New York: Presidio, 2004.  
 Werstein, Irving. Guadalcanal. 1963.

Web

 
 
 
 
 
 
 
 
 
 
 
 
 
 
  – Translation of the official record by the Japanese Demobilization Bureaux detailing the Imperial Japanese Army and Navy's participation in the Southwest Pacific area of the Pacific War.

Audio/visual

  One episode from a 26-episode series about naval combat during World War II.
  Biographical film about Admiral Halsey during the Guadalcanal campaign.
  "Part One" and "Part Two" deal with the Guadalcanal campaign.
 Video including historical footage of the Battle for Guadalcanal

External links

 Presentation by James Hornfischer on his book Neptune's Inferno: The U.S. Navy at Guadalcanal at the Colby Military Writers' Symposium, 11 April 2012

 
1942 in Japan
1942 in the Solomon Islands
1943 in Japan
1943 in the Solomon Islands
Battles and operations of World War II involving the Solomon Islands
Battles of World War II involving Australia
Battles of World War II involving Japan
Battles of World War II involving the United States
Campaigns of World War II
Conflicts in 1942
Conflicts in 1943
Guadalcanal
Pacific Ocean theatre of World War II
United States Marine Corps in World War II
World War II operations and battles of the Pacific theatre
World War II sites in the Solomon Islands
Campaigns, operations and battles of World War II involving the United Kingdom
Amphibious operations of World War II
Amphibious operations involving the United States